Morehead State University (MSU) is a public university in Morehead, Kentucky. The university began as Morehead Normal School, which opened its doors in 1887. The Craft Academy for Excellence in Science and Mathematics, a two-year residential early college high school on the university's campus, was established in 2014.

History

The university began as Morehead Normal School, which opened its doors in 1887. One student appeared on the first day of class in October 1887, in a little, rented cottage where the Adron Doran University Center now stands. The private school closed in the spring of 1922 when the Kentucky General Assembly established Morehead State Normal School. The state institution accepted its first students in the fall of 1923, and graduated its first class in 1927. Name changes occurred again 1926, when it was extended to Morehead State Normal School and Teachers College; in 1930, when it was shortened to just Morehead State Teachers College; in 1948, when it was shortened again to Morehead State College; and, finally, to Morehead State University in 1966. Fourteen people, starting with Frank C. Button, have served as president.  Joseph A. Morgan assumed office as the 14th president on July 1, 2017.

Presidents

 Frank C. Button, 1923–29
 John Howard Payne, 1929–35
 Harvey A. Babb, 1935–40
 William H. Vaughan, 1940–46
 William J. Baird, 1946–51
 Charles R. Spain, 1951–54
 Adron Doran, 1954–77
 Morris L. Norfleet, 1977–84
 Herb. F. Reinhard Jr., 1984–86
 A.D. Albright, 1986–87
 C. Nelson Grote, 1987–92
 Ronald G. Eaglin, 1992–2004
 Wayne D. Andrews, 2005–2017
 Joseph A. Morgan, 2017–present

Academics

Morehead State University is accredited by the Commission on Colleges of the Southern Association of Colleges and Schools. It offers over 212 degree programs at the two-year, four-year, and graduate levels through four colleges: Caudill College of Arts, Humanities, & Social Sciences; Elmer R. Smith College of Business and Technology; Ernst & Sara Lane Volgenau College of Education; and College of Science. It was the first institution in Kentucky to offer a complete degree program online, the Master of Business Administration (MBA). MSU is one of five institutions in the U.S. with a bachelor's degree in space science. Over 70,000 persons have received degrees from MSU.

Rankings
The 2023 U.S. News & World Report Best Colleges Rankings listed Morehead State at 15th place among public "regional universities" in the South and 41st overall among all regional universities in the South.

Craft Academy for Excellence in Science and Mathematics 

The Craft Academy for Excellence in Science and Mathematics was established in 2014. It is a two-year residential early college high school serving approximately 146 high school juniors and seniors at Morehead State University. Students live in Grote-Thompson Hall on campus and take MSU classes during their time at the academy, graduating with a Craft Academy high school diploma as well as at least 60 hours of MSU college credit, with tuition, room and board, and meal plan all free of charge. The academy is funded in large part by Joe Craft and Ambassador Kelly Craft, who donated over $10 million to the academy, the largest donation in MSU history.

In 2019, the academy graduated its third class, with an average ACT score of 31.

Campus

Morehead State University is located in the foothills of the Daniel Boone National Forest in Rowan County. The more than 700-acre main campus within the city limits of Morehead includes more than 50 major structures with a total replacement value of more than $650 million. Beyond the city, the university's real estate holdings include the 320-acre Derrickson Agricultural Complex, Eagle Trace, a par-72, 6,902-yard public golf course, and 166 acres of the Browning Orchard. The instructional plant includes 135 classrooms and 150 laboratories. Housing facilities include space for approximately 2,900 students in a variety of living styles, including traditional residence halls, suites, and apartments. The second component of the Space Science Center opened in 2009—a $16.6 million instruction and research support facility.

Arts
The Morehead State University Arts and Humanities Council, established in 2003, encourages dialogue and partnerships in the arts. Part of a larger initiative within the Caudill College of Arts, Humanities and Social Sciences, the Council works to develop cultural opportunities both on and off campus.  Morehead, long known for its patronage of the arts in Kentucky with such organizations as the Kentucky Folk Art Center and the Kentucky Center for Traditional Music, was the childhood home of philanthropist Lucille Caudill Little. Named after Lucille Little, MSU's Little Company is a touring troupe of students in the Theatre Department that performs plays and conducts workshops for up to 100 schools in the area each year. Along with theatre, Morehead State University has a well-developed dance program. The Morehead Dance Ensemble, which one must audition for, presents a Spring Dance Concert, attends dance conferences, and engages in other projects.

Morehead State University Historic District

A portion of the campus was named as a historic district on the National Register of Historic Places. The contributing properties include the following buildings: the President's Home, Senff Natatorium (demolished in 2008), Button Auditorium, Fields Hall, Camden-Carroll Library, Allie Young Hall, Rader Hall, Grote-Thompson Hall, and the Breckenridge Training School.

Morehead State Public Radio
Morehead State Public Radio (MSPR) is governed by the Board of Regents at Morehead State University. MSPR is operated by its flagship station WMKY at 90.3 FM in Morehead. WMKY in Morehead is licensed for 50,000 watts and serves more than 20 counties in Kentucky, Ohio, and West Virginia. The WMKY studios are located in Breckinridge Hall on the campus of Morehead State University. Since 1965, WMKY has served the communities of eastern Kentucky, southern Ohio, and western West Virginia. MSPR's mission to the region is to provide programming that is educational, informative, and entertaining. Through the work provided by a staff consisting of full-time directors, student interns, work studies, and community volunteers, MSPR offers regional news, public affairs, and documentary programming, as well as a variety of regional music programs consisting of classical, jazz, and Americana. MSPR produces regular daily newscasts and in-depth features on people, places, and events in the region.

Athletics

The Morehead State athletic teams are called the Eagles. The eagle mascot is named Beaker, and the school colors are blue and gold. The university is a member of the NCAA Division I ranks (for football, the Football Championship Subdivision), primarily competing in the Ohio Valley Conference (OVC) since the 1948–49 academic year; while its football team competes in the Pioneer Football League (PFL). The Eagles previously competed in the Kentucky Intercollegiate Athletic Conference (KIAC; now currently known as the River States Conference (RSC) since the 2016–17 school year) of the National Association of Intercollegiate Athletics (NAIA) from 1933–34 to 1947–48; and in the defunct West Virginia Intercollegiate Athletic Conference (WVIAC) from 1929–30 to 1932–33.

Morehead State competes in 17 intercollegiate varsity sports: Men's sports baseball, basketball, cross country, football, golf and track & field; while women's include basketball, beach volleyball, cross country, golf, soccer, softball, track & field and volleyball; and co-ed sports include cheerleading, dance and rifle.

With 2017–18 being its initial season and the OVC not yet sponsoring the sport, the beach volleyball team will compete as an independent. The football team competes as a member of the Pioneer Football League, a non-scholarship Division I (FCS) league.

Accomplishments
The MSU Eagles basketball won the 2009 OVC tournament championship, sending them to the NCAA tournament for the first time since 1984. At the 2011 NCAA Division I men's basketball tournament, 13th-seeded Morehead State upset Louisville 62-61. It was the second NCAA Tournament win for Morehead State in a three-year span. The Eagles also beat Alabama State in the 2009 Opening Round game.  The Eagles then faced 12th-seeded Richmond in the third round, which was only the ninth time in tournament history that a 12–13 match-up occurred in the round of 32. The coed cheerleading squad has won 23 national championships, and the all-female squad has won 10 national titles. The baseball team has won seven OVC conference titles, and the women's volleyball team has won the OVC conference title five times. The Eagles have appeared in the College Basketball Invitational (CBI) three times. Their combined record is 5-4.

Greek life

Residence halls 
Morehead State University's Office of Student Housing provides residential options within the following residence halls:

Alumni Tower
Andrews Hall
Cartmell Hall
Cooper Hall
Eagle Lake Apartments
East Mignon Hall
Fields Hall
Grote-Thompson Hall
Lundergan Hall
Mays Hall Apartments
Mignon Hall
Mignon Tower
Normal Hall Apartments
Nunn Hall
Padula Hall
West Mignon Hall

Campus buildings/Property 

 Academic Athletic Center (AAC)
 Adron Doran University Center (ADUC)
 Alumni Relations and Development(Palmer House)
 Baird Music Hall
 Bert Combs Building
 Breckinridge Hall
 Browning Orchard
 Button Auditorium
 Camden-Carroll Library
 Center for Rural Development
 Challenge Course
 Chi Alpha Fellowship
 Claypool-Young Art Building
 Combs Building
 Cora Wilson Stewart Moonlight School
 Derrickson Agricultural Complex
 Eagle Athletics Guided Learning & Enhancement Center
 Eagle Lake
 Eagle Trace Golf Course
 East Parking Complex and Rocky Adkins Dining Commons (The Rock)
 Education Services Building
 Enrollment Services Center
 Ginger Hall
 Howell-McDowell Administration Building
 Innovation Launchpad
 Intramural/Soccer Practice Field
Jayne Stadium
 Kentucky Center for Traditional Music
 Kentucky Folk Art Center
 Lappin Hall
 Laughlin Health Building
 Little Bell Tower
 Lloyd Cassity Building
 Lundergan Hall
 Newman Center (Catholic Student Center)
 President’s Home
 Procurement Services
 Padula Hall
 Rader Hall
 Recreation & Wellness Center
 Reed Hall
 Rice Service Building (Facilities Management)
 Richardson Arena and Equine Health Education Center
 Fazoli’s Breadstick Beach Volleyball Courts
 Space Science Center (Smith-Booth Hall)
 University Store
 University Farm
 University Softball Field
 Water Testing Laboratory
 Wesley Foundation (Methodist Student Center)
 Wetherby Gymnasium
 21M Space Tracking Antenna
 342 (Baptist Campus Ministries)

Notable alumni

Rocky Adkins – Senior Advisor to Governor Andy Beshear, Former Kentucky State Representative (D-District 99) and House Minority Floor Leader
Henry Akin – basketball player, drafted by New York Knicks, became one of "Original Sonics" in Seattle, played with ABA's Kentucky Colonels 
Nelson Allen – former Kentucky State Senator
Chris Bailey – meteorologist at WKYT-TV
William E. Barber – Marine Corps colonel, recipient of Medal of Honor for actions during Korean War
Denny Doyle – MLB second baseman 1970-77
Kenneth Faried - former NBA player for the Denver Nuggets, Brooklyn Nets, and Houston Rockets, selected 22nd overall in 2011 NBA draft
Mike Gottfried – former head football coach at Kansas, Pittsburgh, Cincinnati, and Murray State, current color commentator and analyst for ESPN
Steve Hamilton (1934–1997) – former MLB pitcher and professional basketball player
Jimmy Higdon – Republican member of Kentucky State Senate since 2009, businessman from Marion County 
David Hyland – defensive back for San Jose SaberCats of Arena Football League
Steve Inskeep (born 1968) – NPR Morning Edition host replacing Kentuckian Bob Edwards
Liz Johnson – professional bowler
Steve Kazee – Tony Award-winning actor for Best Musical
Kelly Kulick – professional bowler and first-ever female winner of regular PBA Tour event (2010 PBA Tournament of Champions)
Karam Mashour (born 1991) - Israeli basketball player in the Israeli Basketball Premier League
Terry McBrayer – 1979 candidate for Governor of Kentucky, former Chairman of Kentucky Democratic Party, attorney in Lexington, KY
Bob McCann – professional basketball player
Lori Menshouse – 1997 Miss Kentucky, 1999 Miss Kentucky USA
Chris Offutt – writer
Amber Philpott – news anchor at WKYT-TV
Jon Rauch – MLB pitcher 2002-13, Olympic gold medalist
Phil Simms – NFL quarterback for New York Giants, MVP of Super Bowl XXI, 15-year pro career, football analyst for CBS television
Janet Stumbo - first woman elected to Kentucky Supreme Court
Dan Swartz - former NBA player with Boston Celtics
David A. Tapp - Judge, United States Court of Federal Claims
Walt Terrell – MLB pitcher 1982-92
Donnie Tyndall (born 1970) – basketball head coach, Tennessee, Southern Miss, Morehead State
Robin L. Webb - former Kentucky State Representative (District 96) and current State Senator ( 18th District ) and attorney
Chuck Woolery – television game show host

References

External links

 
 Official athletics website

 
Public universities and colleges in Kentucky
Educational institutions established in 1887
Universities and colleges accredited by the Southern Association of Colleges and Schools
Education in Rowan County, Kentucky
Buildings and structures in Rowan County, Kentucky
1887 establishments in Kentucky
Historic districts on the National Register of Historic Places in Kentucky
National Register of Historic Places in Rowan County, Kentucky